Viitna is a village in Kadrina Parish, Lääne-Viru County, in northern Estonia. It's located on the Tallinn–Narva road (Estonian main road nr. 1; part of E20), about 71 km east of Tallinn. Viitna has a population of 83 (as of 1 January 2007).

Viitna is best known for the historical tavern (Viitna Inn) situated by the road. It was first mentioned in 1768, since then it has burned down a few times, the last fire was in 1989. Today the tavern is restored, a restaurant and a post office are operating there.

The lakes Viitna Pikkjärv and Viitna Linajärv are located in the southern part of the village.

Gallery

References

External links
Viitna Tavern
Viitna Holiday Centre

Villages in Lääne-Viru County
Tourist attractions in Lääne-Viru County
Kreis Wierland